Luigi Nicola Riserbato (born 18 September 1969 in Matera) is an Italian politician.

Biography
He graduated at the University of Bari and works as a lawyer in the city of Trani, Apulia.

He ran for Mayor of Trani at the 2012 Italian local elections, leading a centre-right coalition. He won and took office on 26 May 2012. He was suspended from office on 22 January 2015 after being charged for fraud, extortion and criminal association. The trial has begun on 27 June 2019.

See also
2012 Italian local elections
List of mayors of Trani

References

External links
 

1969 births
Living people
Mayors of places in Apulia
People from Trani